Clare Junior Hurling Championship is the third-tier hurling competition organized by the Clare County Board of the Gaelic Athletic Association. The competition is confined to clubs organised by Clare GAA. The winners usually will play in the intermediate grade the following year for the Clare Intermediate Hurling Championship. They will also represent Clare GAA in the Munster Junior Club Hurling Championship.

The 2022 Junior Champions are St. Joseph's, Doora-Barefield who defeated their near-neighbours Éire Óg, Ennis by a single point to be crowned champions for the fifth time at this grade.

Roll of honour

See also
 Clare Senior Hurling Championship
 Clare Intermediate Hurling Championship
 Clare Under-21 A Hurling Championship

References

External links
Official Clare Website
Clare on Hoganstand

3
Junior hurling county championships